The men's basketball tournament at the 2012 Summer Olympics in London, began on 29 July and ended on 12 August, when the United States defeated Spain 107–100 for the gold medal. All preliminary games were held at the Basketball Arena within the Olympic Park, while the knockout matches took place at The O2 Arena (renamed North Greenwich Arena due to IOC's no-commercialisation policy).

Qualification

Squads

Competition format
Twelve qualified nations were drawn into two groups, each consisting of six teams. Each game result merits a corresponding point:
*The team has fewer than two players available to play on the court at some point during the game.**A team cannot put forward at least five players at the start of the game, or its own actions prevent play from being resumed.
In case teams are tied on points, the tiebreaking criteria are used, in order of first application:
Results of the games involving the tied teams (head-to-head records)
Goal average of the games involving the tied teams
Goal average of all of the games played
Points scored
Drawing of lots

The teams with the four best records qualified for the knockout stage, which was a single-elimination tournament. The semifinal winners contested for the gold medal, while the losers played for the bronze medal.

Preliminary round
All times are British Summer Time (UTC+1).

Group A

Group B

Knockout round

Quarterfinals

Semifinals

Bronze medal match

Gold medal match

Awards

Statistical leaders

Individual tournament highs

Points

Rebounds

Assists

Blocks

Steals

Minutes

Individual game highs

Team tournament highs

Offensive PPG

Defensive PPG

Rebounds

Assists

Steals

Blocks

Team game highs

ESPN All-Olympics Teams

Honorable Mentions:
 Carlos Delfino
 Leandro Barbosa
 Yi Jianlian
 Nicolas Batum
 Boris Diaw
 Joel Freeland
 Alexey Shved
 Marc Gasol
 Chris Paul
 Kevin Love

Final standings
Rankings are determined by:
1st–4th
Results of gold and bronze medal games.
5th–8th:
Win–loss record in the preliminary round group
Standings in the preliminary round group (i.e. Group A's #3 is ranked higher than Group B's #4.)
Goal average in the preliminary round group
9th–10th and 11th–12th:
5th placers in the preliminary round groups are classified 9th–10th; 6th placers classified *11th–12th
Win–loss record in the preliminary round group
Goal average in the preliminary round group

See also
 Women's Tournament

References

External links
Schedule 
Statistics

 
Basketball at the 2012 Summer Olympics
Basketball at the Summer Olympics – Men's tournament